The Coupe de la Ligue Final 2006 was a football match held at Stade de France, Saint-Denis on 22 April 2006, that saw AS Nancy defeat OGC Nice 2–1 thanks to goals by Monsef Zerka and Kim.

Match details

External links
Report on LFP official site

2006
AS Nancy Lorraine matches
OGC Nice matches
2005–06 in French football
April 2006 sports events in France
Sport in Saint-Denis, Seine-Saint-Denis
Football competitions in Paris
2006 in Paris